Virginia Championship Wrestling (VCW), formerly known as Vanguard Championship Wrestling, is an independent American professional wrestling promotion founded in 1996 by Ronald Nowel. VCW is the leading independent professional wrestling organization in Virginia, United States.

In the early 2000s Travis Bradshaw took over as promoter and rebranded the company as Vanguard Championship Wrestling in 2004. In June 2020, Jerry Stephanitsis took over VCW and rebranded the company back to Virginia Championship Wrestling.

History
The promotion was founded as Virginia Championship Wrestling by Ronald Nowel in 1996.

In the early 2000s Travis Bradshaw took over as the promoter of VCW.

First Rebranding (2004)
In 2004, Virginia Championship Wrestling rebranded to Vanguard Championship Wrestling.

Pivotshare (2004 - Current)
Starting in 2004, VCW started releasing content on the paid subscription service Pivotshare. VCW offers; live events, taped events, documentaries, interviews and talk shows.

Fox 43 (2008 - 2019)
From 2008 to 2019, VCW aired a weekly television show on Fox 43 and expanded to larger venues for live events.

Second Rebranding (2020 - Current)
In June 2020, Jerry Stephanitsis took over as the promoter of VCW and On July 24, 2020, the company was rebranded as Virginia Championship Wrestling, the original name of the company.

Roster
Virginia Championship Wrestling's roster consists mainly of independent freelancers.

Alumni

 2 Damn Bad
 6D6
 A.J. Summers
 Ace Austin
 Adam Page
 Al Snow
 Andre Jackson
 Asaafi
 Austin Aries
 Axton Ray
 Beau Crockett
 Benjamin Banks
 Big Country
 Big MC 123
 Billy Gunn
 Billy The Kid
 Blake Broadway
 Bobby Savage
 Bobby Shields
 Bo Nekoda
 Bolo Yung
 Brady Pierce
 Brandon Day
 Brandon Scott
 Brysin Scott
 C. W. Anderson
 Caleb Konley
 Carlito
 Charlie Dreamer
 Chase Stevens
 Chase Strummer
 Chatch
 Chris Escobar
 Chris Silvio
 Christian York
 Col. Robert Parker
 Colby Corino
 Cousin Skeeter
 Damian Dragon
 Damien Wayne
 Darius Lockhart
 DC Delaney
 Demented Bradley
 Devin Lopez
 Dirty Money
 Dontay Bishop
 Dutch Mantell
 Elijah Burke
 Elizabeth Jordan
 Elliot Russell
 Eric Kreed
 Ethan Cross
 Flex Phenom
 Frankie Fontaine
 Gary Masters
 Gangrel
 George Pantas
 Gino Medina
 Greg Steele
 Gregory Vercetti
 Gremlina
 Harlem Bravado
 Hax Bandito
 Hornswoggle
 Hot Property
 Hy Jinx
 Hype Rockwell
 Idol X
 Irresistible Isaiah
 Irvin Legend
 J-Sin
 Jacey North
 Jack Cicero
 Jack Swagger
 Jake Hollister
 Jake Manning
 James Hall
 Janus
 Jared Evans
 Jay Steel
 Jean Jean Lebon
 Jeff Jarrett
 Jefferson Early
 Jerry Stephanitsis
 Jimmy Cicero
 Jimmy Jack Funk Jr.
 Jimmy Starz
 JJ Blake
 J. J. Dillon
 Joe Black
 Joe Keys
 Joe King
 Joel Maximo
 Joey Matthews
 John Kerman
 John Skyler
 Jordan Oliver
 JT Rain
 Juan Jeremi
 Kacee Carlisle
 KC McKnight
 KC Navarro
 Kekoa The Flyin Hawaiian
 Ken Dixon
 Kevin Thorn
 Kid Canada
 Kid VCW
 Korie James
 Krotch
 Kyler Khan
 Kylie Rae
 L. Lee
 Lance Bravado
 Lance Lude
 Lance McIntyre
 Leo Brien
 Leo Kirby
 Livid The Clown
 Logan Easton LaRoux
 Logan Hodge
 Logan Knight
 Lucious Lance
 Luke Gallows
 Malaki
 Malik
 Marcellus Prime
 Mark Anthony
 Mark Denny
 Markie D
 Matt Saigon
 Maxx Morrison
 Mickie James
 Mike Lynn
 Mike Oridge
 Mike Patrick
 Mikhail Kolov
 Mr. Class
 Mr. Salazar
 Mugabi
 Mysterious Q
 Napalm Bomb
 Neil Sharkey
 O'Shay Edwards
 OB Wright
 Papadon
 Pat Anderson
 Paul London
 Persephone
 Phil Brown
 Poncho Velez
 Preston Quinn
 Q-Sic
 Race Jaxon
 Ramon Watson
 Raven
 Ray Storm
 Ray Vexx
 Raymon Watson
 Rex Sterling
 RH3
 Rhett Titus
 Rhino
 Ricky Martinez
 Ricky Morton
 Ricky Reyes
 Rob Barnes
 Robert Gibson
 Robert Locke
 Robert Royal
 Roc Richards
 Roderick Strong
 Romonus
 Roscoe Hall III
 Ross Hall
 Ryan Davidson
 Ryan Melle
 Ryan Zane
 Sal The Pug
 Sam Bass
 Samantha Starr
 Scott Blaze
 Sean Denny
 Sean Lei
 Sean Studd
 Shane Douglas
 Sexy Steve
 Seymour Snott
 Shane Falco
 Shannon Moore
 Shorty Smalls
 Sigmon
 Sledge Gibson
 Sonjay Dutt
 Spanky
 Spencer Chestnutt
 Sterling Williams
 Steve Corino
 Steve Perez
 Terra X
 The Barbarian
 The Country Kidd
 The Dog
 The Juggernaut
 The Konvict
 The Reason
 The Shield
 Timmy Danger
 Tito Havannah
 Tommy Dreamer
 Tracer X
 Tracy Smothers
 Tyrell Jones
 Ultra Dragon
 Victor Andrews
 Victor Griff
 Waylon Maze
 Wes Rogers
 West Texas Hangman I
 West Texas Hangman II
 Will Maximo
 Wolfbane
 Zack Mason

Events

Championships

Current Champions

Championship History

VCW Heavyweight Championship

VCW Commonwealth Heritage Championship

VCW United States Liberty Championship

VCW Tag Team Championship

Defunct championships

VCW Cruiserweight Championship
Initially, the VCW Cruiserweight Championship was known as the VCW Light Heavyweight Championship.

References

External links
 
 
 
 
 Virginia Championship Wrestling on YouTube
 Virginia Championship Wrestling on Pivotshare

1996 establishments in the United States
American professional wrestling promotions